George Rennie (1801 or 1802 – 22 March 1860) was a Scottish sculptor, and Member of Parliament (MP) for Ipswich, and patron of the arts, who served as Governor of the Falkland Islands between 1847 and 1855.

Life
George Rennie was born in Phantassie, East Lothian, Scotland, to the agriculturist George Rennie by the same's wife. He was a nephew of the engineer John Rennie.

Rennie studied sculpture in Rome before he returned to Britain to exhibit statues and busts at the Royal Academy, and three times at the Suffolk Street Gallery, from 1828 to 1837. His most important works at the academy were: A Gleaner and Grecian Archer (both 1828); Cupid and Hymen (which depicts Cupid blowing the torch of Hymen) which is now in the Victoria and Albert Museum; and busts of Bertel Thorvaldsen and his uncle John Rennie (1831). His commended 1833 works included: The Archer (which he afterwards presented to the Athenaeum Club, London, and a bust of the artist David Wilkie. He exhibited The Minstrel in 1834. Rennie's 1836 suggestion to Sir Sir William Ewart that he form a Parliamentary Committee provoked the creation of schools of design at Somerset House. He assisted the efforts of Joseph Hume to obtain public freedom of access to all monuments and works of art that were in public either buildings or museums.

Rennie from 1841 to 1842 was Liberal Member of Parliament (MP) for Ipswich. His election was in May 1842 voided, and he in May 1842 withdrew from the 1847 general election to enable the election of Hugh Adair. He in 1842 proposed the 'New Edinburgh' for a Scottish settlement in New Zealand, the development of which is now called Dunedin. Rennie on 15 December 1847, was invested as Governor of the Falkland Islands, from which he returned to England in 1855. He died in London on 22 March 1860.

Rennie's sons included: Richard Rennie, Chief Justice of the British Supreme Court for China and Japan; and William Hepburn Rennie, Auditor-General of Hong Kong and Lieutenant-Governor of Saint Vincent and the Grenadines.

References
Attribution

George Rennie entry from the online Dictionary of Falklands Biography

External links 
 

1802 births
1860 deaths
Governors of the Falkland Islands
Scottish sculptors
Scottish male sculptors
Members of the Parliament of the United Kingdom for Ipswich
UK MPs 1841–1847
19th-century British sculptors
People from East Linton